Club Deportivo Fuencarral is a football club based in Madrid in the autonomous community of Community of Madrid. It plays in the Tercera de Aficionados. Its stadium is Estadio Valverde with a capacity of 900 seats.

Season to season

5 seasons in Tercera División

External links
Futmadrid profile
Madrid FA profile

Football clubs in Madrid
Association football clubs established in 1950
Divisiones Regionales de Fútbol clubs
1950 establishments in Spain